Barry Andrew Hay (born 16 August 1948) is an Indian-born Dutch musician; he was the lead vocalist and frontman of Dutch rock band Golden Earring from 1967 until their disbandment in 2021.

Biography
Hay was born in Faizabad, India, to a Dutch-Jewish mother, Sofia Maria née Sluijter (1922–2004, born in Makassar), and a Scottish commissioned officer, Philip Aubrey Hay (1923–1980). He moved to the Netherlands at the age of eight to live with his mother. He lived in Amsterdam and later in The Hague, attending an English boarding school.

After graduating from secondary school, he took courses at the Royal Academy of Art, The Hague.

Music career and voice acting
Hay started his music career with a band called The Haigs.  In the summer of 1967, he was asked to join the Golden Earrings, as they were then called, replacing Frans Krassenburg. Hay created the cover art for some of Golden Earring's albums.

He has also made three solo albums. Only Parrots, Frogs and Angels (1972) and Victory of Bad Taste (1987) both has little success. The Big Band Theory (2008) is available for online streaming.

In 1994, he sang lead vocals and played alto flute on the Ayreon song "Sail Away to Avalon", the single from the latter's debut album, The Final Experiment.

In 2001, Hay left The Hague and moved back to Amsterdam, although he now divides his time between the Netherlands and Curaçao, where he hosts a radio-show. During the 2000s, Hay provided the Dutch voice of Rock Zilla in the Canadian cartoon show My Dad The Rock Star, and he appeared in an advertisement for prescription sunglasses.

In 2016, Hay released an album with side-project Flying V Formation, and his biography.

In 2019, Hay released an album with musician JB Meijers (The Common Linnets); For You Baby contains Latin-flavoured cover versions, including Blue Bayou, a duet with Danny Vera.

References

1948 births
Living people
Dutch people of Scottish descent
Dutch people of Jewish descent
Dutch male singers
Dutch rock singers
Royal Academy of Art, The Hague alumni
English-language singers from the Netherlands
Golden Earring members
People from Faizabad
Musicians from The Hague
Album-cover and concert-poster artists